Providence Township, Pennsylvania may refer to:

 Providence Township, Bedford County, Pennsylvania, formed in 1780 and split in 1854 into:
 East Providence Township, Bedford County, Pennsylvania
 West Providence Township, Bedford County, Pennsylvania
 Providence Township, Chester County, Pennsylvania, which split in 1687, and then formed part of Delaware county in 1789, yielding:
 Nether Providence Township, Delaware County, Pennsylvania
 Upper Providence Township, Delaware County, Pennsylvania
 Providence Township, Lancaster County, Pennsylvania
 Providence Township, Montgomery County, Pennsylvania, which split in 1805 into:
 Lower Providence Township, Montgomery County, Pennsylvania
 Upper Providence Township, Montgomery County, Pennsylvania

Pennsylvania township disambiguation pages